The Ambassador of the Republic of the Philippines to the Kingdom of Spain is the Republic of the Philippines' foremost diplomatic representative in the Kingdom of Spain. As head of the Philippines' diplomatic mission there, the Ambassador is the official representative of the President and the Government of the Philippines to the Monarch and Government of Spain. The position has the rank and status of an Ambassador Extraordinary and Plenipotentiary and is based at the embassy located in the capital of Spain, Madrid.

List of representatives

References

External links
Official website of the Embassy of the Philippines, Madrid

 
Philippines
Spain